The following television stations operate on virtual channel 29 in the United States:

 K11SZ-D in Oakridge, Oregon
 K16LI-D in Port Orford, Oregon
 K19CV-D in Redwood Falls, Minnesota
 K19EC-D in Mapleton, Oregon
 K20IR-D in Cottage Grove, Oregon
 K20LL-D in Reedsport, Oregon
 K21FS-D in Eugene, Oregon
 K23KD-D in Coos Bay, etc., Oregon
 K25LA-D in Fort Morgan, Colorado
 K29GK-D in Twentynine Palms, etc, California
 K29HW-D in Austin, Texas
 K29IF-D in Frost, Minnesota
 K29JT-D in Butte, Montana
 K29JU-D in Garden City, Kansas
 K29KG-D in Idaho Falls, Idaho
 K29KU-D in Bend, Oregon
 K29KY-D in Blackfoot, Idaho
 K29NW-D in Midland, Texas
 K29NX-D in Alexandria, Louisiana
 K29NY-D in Alexandria, Minnesota
 K29OC-D in Chapman, Kansas
 K29OF-D in Deadwood, South Dakota
 K30AF-D in Alexandria, Minnesota
 K32HF-D in Florence, Oregon
 K32OC-D in Corpus Christi, Texas
 K33KD-D in London Springs, Oregon
 K33LZ-D in Myrtle Point, Oregon
 K34JX-D in St. James, Minnesota
 K50KK-D in Ellensburg, Washington
 K51AL-D in Olivia, Minnesota
 KABB in San Antonio, Texas
 KBAK-TV in Bakersfield, California
 KBJE-LD in Tyler, Texas
 KCWE in Kansas City, Missouri
 KECA-LD in Eureka, California
 KGRQ-LD in Gila River Indian Community, Arizona
 KGRX-LD in Gila River Indian Community, Arizona
 KGRY-LD in Gila River Indian Community, Arizona
 KHNE-TV in Hastings, Nebraska
 KHOG-TV in Fayetteville, Arkansas
 KIMA-TV in Yakima, Washington
 KMPX in Decatur, Texas
 KNKC-LD in Lubbock, Texas
 KPCE-LD in Tucson, Arizona
 KQMM-CD in Santa Maria, California
 KSPX-TV in Sacramento, California
 KTNR-LD in Laredo, Texas
 KTZT-CD in Tulsa, Oklahoma
 KUPT in Hobbs, New Mexico
 KVHP in Lake Charles, Louisiana
 W22EX-D in Staunton, Virginia
 W29CI-D in Salem, Illinois
 W29CW-D in Duck Key, Florida
 W29DN-D in Athens, Georgia
 W29EJ-D in Parkersburg, West Virginia
 W29EN-D in Soperton, Georgia
 W29FJ-D in Dothan, Alabama
 W29FK-D in Clarksburg, West Virginia
 W29FR-D in Lebanon-Nashville, Tennessee
 W31EU-D in Columbus, Georgia
 WAUR-LD in Aurora, Illinois
 WAZS-LD in North Charleston, South Carolina
 WBIH in Selma, Alabama
 WDZC-LD in Augusta, Georgia
 WEDS-LD in Mobile, Alabama
 WFET-LD in Lewisburg, Tennessee
 WFLX in West Palm Beach, Florida
 WGTU in Traverse City, Michigan
 WHVL-LD in State College, etc., Pennsylvania
 WIVN-LD in Newcomerstown, Ohio
 WJDO-LD in Macon, Georgia
 WKPD in Paducah, Kentucky
 WKSO-TV in Somerset, Kentucky
 WLPX-TV in Charleston, West Virginia
 WMPN-TV in Jackson, Mississippi
 WMUM-TV in Cochran, Georgia
 WNTV in Greenville, South Carolina
 WOMS-CD in Muskegon, Michigan
 WOOH-LD in Zanesville, Ohio
 WRCF-CD in Orlando, Florida
 WTHV-LD in Huntsville, Alabama
 WTMQ-LD in Jacksonville, North Carolina
 WTMV-LD in Ogden, North Carolina
 WTTK in Kokomo, Indiana
 WTXF-TV in Philadelphia, Pennsylvania
 WUBF-LD in Jacksonville, Florida
 WUHQ-LD in Grand Rapids, Michigan
 WUTV in Buffalo, New York
 WVIR-CD in Charlottesville, Virginia
 WVIR-TV in Charlottesville, Virginia
 WZPK-LD in Highland, New York

The following stations, which are no longer licensed, formerly operated on virtual channel 29:
 K29JB-D in Moses Lake, Washington
 K29JD-D in Redding, California
 K29JF-D in Rolla, Missouri
 KBKV-LD in Columbia, Missouri
 KFJK-LD in Santa Fe, New Mexico
 W29DT-D in Tuscaloosa, Alabama
 W30EX-D in Lima, Ohio
 WAOH-CD in Akron, Ohio
 WEHG-LD in Wausau, Wisconsin

References

29 virtual